Sedgemoor is a low-lying area of land in Somerset, England.  It lies close to sea level south of the Polden Hills, historically largely marsh (or "moor" in its older sense). The eastern part is known as King's Sedgemoor, and the western part West Sedgemoor.  Sedgemoor is part of the area now known as the Somerset Levels and Moors.  Historically the area was known as the site of the Battle of Sedgemoor.

Sedgemoor has given its name to a local government district formed on 1 April 1974, under the Local Government Act 1972, by a merger of the municipal borough of Bridgwater, the Burnham-on-Sea urban district, Bridgwater Rural District and part of Axbridge Rural District.  The district covers a larger area than the historical Sedgemoor, extending north of the Polden Hills across the Somerset Levels and Moors to the Mendip Hills.

On 1 April 2023 the district will be abolished and replaced by a new unitary district for the area at present served by Somerset County Council.  The new council will be known as Somerset Council.
Elections for the new council took place in May 2022, and it now will run alongside Sedgemoor and the other councils until their abolition in April 2023.

Toponymy
Sedgemoor does not mean "sedge moor", but is instead "marsh of a man called Sicga" from the Old Norse personal name Sicga and Old English mor "moor". The name was recorded as Secgamere in 1165.

Towns

Bridgwater – the administrative centre
Burnham-on-Sea
North Petherton
Highbridge
Axbridge
Cheddar

Parishes

Rivers

River Parrett
River Brue
River Huntspill
King's Sedgemoor Drain

Battles
Battle of Sedgemoor 1685

Industry
Light industry now predominates, but traditional trades including peat extraction, willow crafts and cider making may still be found, in addition to livestock farming.  The River Parrett provides a source of eels (anguilla anguilla) and elvers from January through to May.

Also notable is the new Isleport trading estate at Highbridge, which houses many global businesses such as Geest (Isleport Foods) who make yoghurt under franchise to Ski & Muller, Brake Brothers who supply the catering trade, BFP wholesale who supply dry goods to bakeries etc., Woodbury & Haines who supply furniture globally, Polybeam Limited who supply GRP radio masts to customers such as Marconi, and also AT&T whose centre there controls all internet cable traffic to and from the US.

Industry in Bridgwater has also seen major growth recently with the opening of "Express Park" which houses Gerber Foods (a global fruit juice supplier), NHS Logistics depot and Eddie Stobart depot.  South of Bridgwater, at Huntworth, is a large Somerfield depot which supplies their Somerfield and former Kwik Save stores in the south west.

Governance

Sedgemoor District Council

The Sedgemoor district was established in 1974 and is based in Bridgwater. It covers a mostly rural area between the Quantock Hills and the Mendip Hills.

Members of UK parliament

The area is falls within the
Bridgwater and West Somerset and Wells county constituencies which are represented in the House of Commons of the Parliament of the United Kingdom by the first past the post system of election. The current MP for Bridgewater and West Somerset is Ian Liddell-Grainger, a Conservative; for Wells the MP is James Heappey, also a Conservative, who won the seat in 2015 from Tessa Munt, a Liberal Democrat.

Education

Schools (those which are not independent) in Sedgemoor are operated the Children & Young People's Directorate of Somerset County Council, although some such as The Kings of Wessex School in Cheddar have distanced themselves from the county council by opting for foundation and then subsequently academy status.

See also

 List of Grade I listed buildings in Sedgemoor
 List of Scheduled Monuments in Sedgemoor

References

External links
Sedgemoor District Council
Somerset by the Sea (tourism website)

 
Non-metropolitan districts of Somerset